Trompe-l'œil is an artistic term for the highly realistic optical illusion of three-dimensional space and objects on a two-dimensional surface. Trompe l'oeil, which is most often associated with painting, tricks the viewer into perceiving painted objects or spaces as real. Forced perspective is a related illusion in architecture.

History in painting

The phrase, which can also be spelled without the hyphen and ligature in English as trompe l'oeil, originates with the artist Louis-Léopold Boilly, who used it as the title of a painting he exhibited in the Paris Salon of 1800. Although the term gained currency only in the early 19th century, the illusionistic technique associated with trompe-l'œil dates much further back. It was (and is) often employed in murals. Instances from Greek and Roman times are known, for instance in Pompeii. A typical trompe-l'œil mural might depict a window, door, or hallway, intended to suggest a larger room.

A version of an oft-told ancient Greek story concerns a contest between two renowned painters. Zeuxis (born around 464 BC) produced a still life painting so convincing that birds flew down to peck at the painted grapes. A rival, Parrhasius, asked Zeuxis to judge one of his paintings that was behind a pair of tattered curtains in his study. Parrhasius asked Zeuxis to pull back the curtains, but when Zeuxis tried, he could not, as the curtains were included in Parrhasius's painting—making Parrhasius the winner.

Perspective
A fascination with perspective drawing arose during the Renaissance. But also Giotto began using perspective at the end of 1200 with the cycle of Assisi in Saint Francis stories. Many Italian painters of the late Quattrocento, such as Andrea Mantegna (1431–1506) and Melozzo da Forlì (1438–1494), began painting illusionistic ceiling paintings, generally in fresco, that employed perspective and techniques such as foreshortening to create the impression of greater space for the viewer below. This type of trompe l'œil illusionism as specifically applied to ceiling paintings is known as di sotto in sù, meaning "from below, upward" in Italian. The elements above the viewer are rendered as if viewed from true vanishing point perspective. Well-known examples are the Camera degli Sposi in Mantua and Antonio da Correggio's (1489–1534) Assumption of the Virgin in the Parma Cathedral.

Similarly, Vittorio Carpaccio (1460–1525) and Jacopo de' Barbari (c. 1440 – before 1516) added small trompe l'œil features to their paintings, playfully exploring the boundary between image and reality. For example, a painted fly might appear to be sitting on the painting's frame, or a curtain might appear to partly conceal the painting, a piece of paper might appear to be attached to a board, or a person might appear to be climbing out of the painting altogether—all in reference to the contest of Zeuxis and Parrhasius.

Quadratura

Perspective theories in the 17th century allowed a more fully integrated approach to architectural illusion, which when used by painters to "open up" the space of a wall or ceiling is known as quadratura. Examples include Pietro da Cortona's Allegory of Divine Providence in the Palazzo Barberini and Andrea Pozzo's Apotheosis of St Ignatius on the ceiling of the Roman church of Sant'Ignazio in Campo Marzio.

The Mannerist and Baroque style interiors of Jesuit churches in the 16th and 17th centuries often included such trompe-l'œil ceiling paintings, which optically "open" the ceiling or dome to the heavens with a depiction of Jesus', Mary's, or a saint's ascension or assumption. An example of a perfect architectural trompe-l'œil is the illusionistic dome in the Jesuit church, Vienna, by Andrea Pozzo, which is only slightly curved, but gives the impression of true architecture.

Trompe-l'œil paintings became very popular in Flemish and later in Dutch painting in the 17th century arising from the development of still life painting. The Flemish painter Cornelis Norbertus Gysbrechts created a chantourné painting showing an easel holding a painting. Chantourné literally means 'cutout' and refers to a trompe l'œil representation designed to stand away from a wall. The Dutch painter Samuel Dirksz van Hoogstraten was a master of the trompe-l'œil and theorized on the role of art as the lifelike imitation of nature in his 1678 book, the Introduction to the Academy of Painting, or the Visible World (Inleyding tot de hooge schoole der schilderkonst: anders de zichtbaere werelt, Rotterdam, 1678).

A fanciful form of architectural trompe-l'œil, quodlibet, features realistically rendered paintings of such items as paper knives, playing cards, ribbons, and scissors, apparently accidentally left lying around.

Trompe-l'œil can also be found painted on tables and other items of furniture, on which, for example, a deck of playing cards might appear to be sitting on the table. A particularly impressive example can be seen at Chatsworth House in Derbyshire, where one of the internal doors appears to have a violin and bow suspended from it, in a trompe l'œil painted around 1723 by Jan van der Vaart. Another example can be found in the Painted Hall at the Old Royal Naval College, Greenwich, London. This Wren building was painted by Sir James Thornhill, the first British born painter to be knighted and is a classic example of the Baroque style popular in the early 18th century. The American 19th-century still-life painter William Harnett specialized in trompe-l'œil. In the 20th century, from the 1960s on, the American Richard Haas and many others painted large trompe-l'œil murals on the sides of city buildings, and from beginning of the 1980s when German Artist Rainer Maria Latzke began to combine classical fresco art with contemporary content trompe-l'œil became increasingly popular for interior murals. The Spanish painter Salvador Dalí utilized the technique for a number of his paintings.

In other art forms
Trompe-l'œil, in the form of "forced perspective", has long been used in stage-theater set design, so as to create the illusion of a much deeper space than the existing stage. A famous early example is the Teatro Olimpico in Vicenza, with Vincenzo Scamozzi's seven forced-perspective "streets" (1585), which appear to recede into the distance.

Trompe-l'œil is employed in Donald O'Connor's famous "Running up the wall" scene in the film Singin' in the Rain (1954). During the finale of his "Make 'em Laugh" number he first runs up a real wall. Then he runs towards what appears to be a hallway, but when he runs up this as well we realize that it is a large trompe-l'œil mural. More recently, Roy Andersson has made use of similar techniques in his feature films.

Matte painting is a variant of trompe-l'œil, and is used in film production with elements of a scene are painted on glass panels mounted in front of the camera.

Elsa Schiaparelli frequently made use of trompe-l'œil in her designs, most famously perhaps in her Bowknot Sweater, which some consider to be the first use of trompe-l'œil in fashion. The Tears Dress, which she did in collaboration with Salvador Dalí, features both appliqué tears on the veil and tromp-l'œil tears on the dress itself.

Fictional trompe-l'œil appears in many Looney Tunes, such as the Road Runner cartoons, where, for example, Wile E. Coyote paints a tunnel on a rock wall, and the Road Runner then races through the fake tunnel. This is usually followed by the coyote's foolishly trying to run through the tunnel after the road runner, only to smash into the hard rock-face. This sight gag was employed in Who Framed Roger Rabbit.

In Chicago's Near North Side, Richard Haas used a 16-story 1929 apartment hotel converted into a 1981 apartment building for trompe-l'œil murals in homage to Chicago school architecture. One of the building's sides features the Chicago Board of Trade Building, intended as a reflection of the building located two miles south.

Several contemporary artists use chalk on pavement or sidewalk to create trompe-l'œil works, a technique called street painting or "pavement art". These creations last only until washed away, and therefore must be photographed to be preserved. Practitioners of this form include Julian Beever, Edgar Mueller, Leon Keer, and Kurt Wenner.

The Palazzo Salis of Tirano, Italy, has over centuries and throughout the palace used trompe l'œil in place of more expensive real masonry, doors, staircases, balconies, and draperies to create an illusion of sumptuousness and opulence.

Trompe-l’œil in the form of illusion architecture and Lüftlmalerei is common on façades in the Alpine region.

Trompe l'œil, in the form of "illusion painting", is also used in contemporary interior design, where illusionary wall paintings experienced a renaissance since around 1980. Significant artists in this field are the German muralist Rainer Maria Latzke, who invented, in the 1990s, a new method of producing illusion paintings, frescography, and the English artist Graham Rust.

OK Go's music video for "The Writing's on the Wall" uses a number of trompe-l'œil illusions alongside other optical illusions, captured through a one-shot take. Trompe-l'œil  illusions have been used as gameplay mechanics in video games such as The Witness and Superliminal.

Japanese filmmaker and animator Isao Takahata regarded achieving a sense of trompe-l'œil to be important for his work, stating that an animated world should feel as if it "existed right there" so that "people believe in a fantasy world and characters that no one has seen in reality."

Tourists attractions employing large-scale illusory art allowing visitors to photograph themselves in fantastic scenes have opened in several Asian countries, such as the Trickeye Museum and Hong Kong 3D Museum.
Recently a Trick Art Museum opened in Europe and uses more photographic approaches.

Artists

Old Masters
Cornelis Biltius
Jacob Biltius
Donato Bramante
Petrus Christus
Antonio da Correggio
Carlo Crivelli
Luca Giordano
Cornelis Norbertus Gysbrechts
Franciscus Gijsbrechts
Samuel Dirksz van Hoogstraten
Andrea Mantegna
Masaccio
Jean-Francois de la Motte
Charles Willson Peale
 Jacobus Plasschaert
Andrea Pozzo
Vincenzo Scamozzi
Giovanni Battista Tiepolo

19th century and modern masters
Henry Alexander
Aaron Bohrod
Louis-Léopold Boilly
Salvador Dalí
Walter Goodman
John Haberle
William Harnett
Claude Raguet Hirst
René Magritte
John F. Peto

Contemporary
Ellen Altfest
Martin Battersby
Julian Beever
Daniela Benedini
Henri Bol
Henri Cadiou
Dan Colen
Piero Fornasetti
Ronald Francis
Joanne Gair
Frederic Gracia
Richard Haas
Jonty Hurwitz
Lorena Kloosterboer
Rainer Maria Latzke
Attila Meszlenyi
István Orosz (Utisz)
Os Gêmeos, "The Twins"
Jacques Poirier
Susan Powers
John Pugh
Pierre-Marie Rudelle
Graham Rust
Anthony Waichulis
Kurt Wenner
Tavar Zawacki

Paintings

Murals

Sculptures

Architecture

Use in films
Singin' in the Rain (1952)
Willy Wonka & the Chocolate Factory (1971)
Indiana Jones and the Last Crusade (1989)
Where the Heart Is (1990)
Millennium Actress (2001)
Eternal Sunshine of the Spotless Mind (2004)
Bewitched (2005)
Westworld (Season 1, Episode 7) (2016)

See also
2.5D - enhancement of 2-dimensional graphics by limited application of some 3D effects to them
Bump mapping, normal mapping and parallax mapping - graphical techniques used to add fake details that enhance 2D representations of 3D objects (in the context of that branch of computer graphics that aims to give a realistic 3D view on the screen)
Camouflage
Marbling
Faux painting
Photorealism
Anamorphosis
List of art techniques

Notes

External links

Deceptions and Illusions, National Gallery of Art exhibition on Trompe-l'œil paintings
Trompe l'œil Tricks: Borges' Baroque Illusionism, essay by Lois Parkinson Zamora comparing trompe-l'œil to the literature of Borges
Custom trompe l'œil Paintings, Fresco Blog
murals.trompe-l-oeil.info , More than 10 000 pictures and 1200 Outdoor murals of France and Europe
Paris: Trompe-l'oeil, surréalisme urbain?, Avenue George V. Text and photography by Catherine-Alice Palagret
“The Mechanics of the Art World,” Vistas: Visual Culture in Spanish America, 1520-1820.
Trick Art Museum: Magic World Museum Barcelona 

 
Visual arts genres
Architectural elements
Artistic techniques
Painting techniques
Optical illusions
Decorative arts
Composition in visual art